Miguel Patricio (born 1966/1967) is a Portuguese businessman, and the CEO of Kraft Heinz. He succeeded Bernardo Hees in July 2019.

Early life
Patricio was born in Portugal. He graduated in Business Administration at FGV EAESP - Escola de Administração de Empresas de São Paulo, Brazil, in 1989.

Career
Early in his career, Patricio worked for Philip Morris International, Coca-Cola and Johnson & Johnson. Patricio then worked for Anheuser-Busch InBev for two decades, rising to chief marketing officer, from 2012 until July 2018.

References

Coca-Cola people
Johnson & Johnson people
AB InBev people
Kraft Heinz people
Living people
Portuguese chief executives
1960s births